Bufo is a genus of true toads in the amphibian family Bufonidae. As traditionally defined, it was a wastebasket genus containing a large number of toads from much of the world, but following taxonomic reviews most of these have been moved to other genera, leaving only seventeen extant (living) species from Europe, northern Africa and Asia in this genus, including the well-known common toad (B. bufo). Some of the genera that contain species formerly placed in Bufo are Anaxyrus (many North American species), Bufotes (European green toad and relatives), Duttaphrynus (many Asian species, including the Asian common toad introduced elsewhere),  Epidalea (natterjack toad) and Rhinella (many Latin American species, including the cane toad introduced elsewhere).

Description 
True toads have in common stocky figures and short legs, which make them relatively poor jumpers. Their dry skin is thick and "warty".

Behind their eyes, Bufo species have wart-like structures, the parotoid glands. These glands distinguish the true toads from all other tailless amphibians. They secrete a fatty, white poisonous substance which acts as a deterrent to predators. Contrary to folk belief, handling toads does not cause warts, however due to the poison they secrete, and bacteria on their skins, a person should wash their hands thoroughly after handling one. The poison of most if not all toads contains bufotoxin.

Species 
Formerly, the genus Bufo encompassed many species and was divided into several subgenera. Frost et al. (2006) removed most of the species of former Bufo to other genera and restricted the name Bufo to members of the Bufo bufo group of earlier authors. Now, this genus has been reduced to seventeen extant species:

Footnotes

References 
 amphibiaweb.org - Bufo
 Blair (ed.), 1972, Evol. Genus Bufo.
 Frank and Ramus, 1995, Compl. Guide Scient. Common Names Amph. Rept. World
 
  (2004) The history of a Nearctic colonization: Molecular phylogenetics and biogeography of the Nearctic toads (Bufo). Evolution 58: 2517–2535.
  (2009): Taxonomic freedom and the role of official lists of species names. Herpetologica 65: 115–128.  PDF full-text

 
Amphibian genera